Everton Charles Dennis better known by his stage name E-Dee, is a reggae singer-songwriter who mixes the dancehall, hip-hop and electronic genres.

E-Dee is an independent artist, who since his first official release in 2005 has reached the Jamaican Top Ten charts twice, and recently starred in a feature film loosely based on his life entitled Out the Gate.

Early life
Dennis was born in Toll Gate in the Parish of Clarendon, Jamaica, the youngest of 12 children. His mother died when Everton was young. When he completed school, he traveled to Los Angeles to start his career in music and acting.

Career
After studying music and acting at the Musicians Institute in Hollywood, E-Dee began recording with local producers releasing mixtapes, and started to book shows as his reputation grew. In 2004 The 6' 5" entertainer met platinum producer Qmillion and he signed with Unseen Lab Recordings. In 2005 he released his first official single "R U Ready" and subsequent album "JA 2 LA 2 DI World".  Sales were strong in Japan, but it wasn't until 2007 that Jamaica began to know E-Dee as he burst on to the music scene in 2007 when his collaboration with Irie Love, "Revolution" hit the top ten in Jamaica, and was nominated for an EME award for best collaboration. At the same time his feature on Ms. Triniti's hit "Bongce Along" was also in the Top Ten on the island as well as landing in the Top 20 Billboard R&B/Hip-Hop single sales charts.
In 2010 Dennis reached the Jamaican Top Ten charts again with "Rightful Place".
In 2011, Everton starred in Out the Gate a feature film loosely based on his life. The film was released to theaters in Los Angeles, New York, Atlanta, Toronto, as well as Jamaica. Newspaper Atlanta Daily World wrote the movie "appears to be on its way to becoming a classic". Its DVD was released Dec 2012.

His most recent album "Elevate" was released May 2022, and features collaborations from Wayne Wonder, Future Fambo, Glen Washington, I-Octane, and Irie Love. 

Dennis's songs have been sought after by Hollywood appearing in the feature films I Think I Love My Wife, How She Move, Like Mike 2: Streetball, and the television shows Greek (TV Series), Blue Bloods, The Bad Girls Club

Discography

Albums
2006: JA 2 LA 2 Di WORLD
2007: Dancehall Celebrity (Japan Only)
2010: Rightful Place (EP)
2012: Out the Gate : Motion Picture Soundtrack
2022: Elevate

Singles
2005 R U Ready?           | Unseen Lab |  ULR44882
2007 Revolution ft. Irie Love                   | Unseen Lab | ULR44922
2008 Yutes Dem   		| Unseen Lab | ULR44942
2009 Yutes Nowadays                           | Unseen Lab | ULR44942
2010 Rightful Place        | Unseen Lab | ULR44972
2011 Wine Pon Di Buddy      | Unseen Lab | ULR44992
2012 Girl I'll Come Over (feat. Wayne Wonder) |  Unseen Lab  | ULR50112
2014 So Badmind      | Unseen Lab | ULR50527
2015 Where I Belong (feat Glen Washington)   | Unseen Lab | ULR55608
2016 She Ready Now. | Unseen Lab | ULR50532
2016 Treat Me Right   | Unseen Lab | ULR50533
2017 Island Energy  | Unseen Lab | ULR50522
2020 Needed Me (alone) | Unseen Lab | ULR57234
2021 Fancy Face | Unseen Lab | ULR55608
2021 Good Body Girl | Unseen Lab 
2022 Every time I See You | Unseen Lab | ULR55608

Videos
2005 R U Ready?
2007 Revolution (feat. Irie Love)
2008 Yutes Dem
2010 Rightful Place
2013 Ghetto Yutes Rise (feat. I-Octane)
2013 No Other Girl (I'm Sorry)
2014 So Badmind
2014 Between The Sheets
2016 Where I Belong
2016 She Ready Now
2016 Treat Me Right
2017 Island Energy
2020 Needed Me (alone)
2021 Fancy Face
2022 Every time I See You

Songs in Film and Television
Greek "R U Ready?"
Like Mike 2: Streetball  "Dangerous" 
How She Move "JSJ Reggaehall" 
I Think I Love My Wife "The Beat is" 
Chris Spencer's Minority Report "Represent Where Your From"
Blue Bloods "Summertime"
The Bad Girls Club "Summertime"

Filmography

References

External links
 Official Website
 
  E-Dee on SongKick
 E-Dee on Spotify

Jamaican reggae musicians
21st-century Jamaican male actors
21st-century Jamaican male singers
Living people
1981 births
People from Clarendon Parish, Jamaica
Jamaican male film actors